Walter Henry Culpitt (14 January 1918 – 15 October 1994) was an Australian rules footballer who played for Hawthorn in the VFL during the 1940s. 

Culpitt was a key position player and started his career in defence. The 1943 season saw him pushed to full forward and he topped Hawthorn's goalkicking with 43 goals, and again the following season with 57 goals. For the rest of his career he was used mostly at fullback and it was in that position that he was chosen to represent Victoria at the 1947 Hobart Carnival. It had been a good year for Culpitt, he won Hawthorn's best and fairest and finished equal third in the Brownlow Medal count.

When Culpitt left Hawthorn he accepted a position as captain-coach of Wimmera's team of Minyip. After two years in Minyip, Culpitt was on the move. In 1951 he coached Kyneton and the following year he coached Castlemaine to the Bendigo Football League premiership.

References

External links

1918 births
1994 deaths
Australian rules footballers from Victoria (Australia)
Hawthorn Football Club players
Peter Crimmins Medal winners
Sturt Football Club players
Australian Army personnel of World War II
Australian Army soldiers